The 2015 Women's Indoor Hockey World Cup was the fourth edition of this tournament. It was played on 4–8 February 2015 in Leipzig, Germany.

The Netherlands defeated Germany after penalties in the final to win their second title.

Results
The schedule was released on 10 October 2014.

All times are Central European Time (UTC+02:00)

First round

Pool A

Pool B

Ninth to twelfth place classification

Crossover

Eleventh and twelfth place

Ninth and tenth place

Second round

Fifth to eighth place classification

Quarter-finals

Fifth to eighth place classification

Crossover

Seventh and eighth place

Fifth and sixth place

First to fourth place classification

Semi-finals

Third and fourth place

Final

Final standings

Awards
Most Valuable Player: 
Top Scorer: 
Best Goalkeeper: 
Best U21 Player:

References

External links
Official website
Official FIH website

2015
Indoor World Cup
Indoor Hockey World Cup
International women's indoor hockey competitions hosted by Germany
Sports competitions in Leipzig
Indoor Hockey World Cup Women
2010s in Saxony
World Cup